Tinnye is a village in Pest county, Hungary.

Geography

Lakes
Lake Garancsi

References

Populated places in Pest County